Heiko Fischer (25 February 1960 — 21 November 1989) was a German figure skater who competed for West Germany. He was the 1982 Skate America silver medalist, 1982 Skate Canada bronze medalist, a two-time Nebelhorn Trophy champion, a five-time German national champion, and competed at two Winter Olympics.

Life and career 
Heiko Fischer won the German Championships in 1982, 1983, 1985, 1986, and 1988. He trained under Karel Fajfr and represented the TUS Stuttgart club nationally. During his career, he beat Norbert Schramm and Rudi Cerne on the national level. 

He collapsed during a game of squash with friends on 21 November 1989. He died of chronic myocarditis (inflammation of the heart muscle) at the age of 29 in Sindelfingen hospital. His wife, Angela, was seven months pregnant when he died, giving birth to their son in 1990.

As a tribute to him, the Heiko Fischer Cup (also Heiko Fischer Pokal) has been held in Stuttgart since 1991.

Results

References 

1960 births
1989 deaths
Sportspeople from Stuttgart
German male single skaters
Olympic figure skaters of West Germany
Figure skaters at the 1988 Winter Olympics
Figure skaters at the 1984 Winter Olympics